Speed Fever (Swedish: Fartfeber) is a 1953 Swedish drama film directed by Egil Holmsen and starring Arne Ragneborn, Sven-Axel Carlsson and Erik Berglund. The film's sets were designed by the art director Bertil Duroj. It was shot on location around Stockholm.

Cast
 Arne Ragneborn as Kent Grönholm
 Sven-Axel Carlsson as 	Rolf 'Kina' Carlsson
 Håkan Serner as 	Gunnar Norén
 Erik Berglund as 	Klemens Grönholm
 Britta Brunius as 	Gunnar's Mother
 Erna Groth as 	Gerd
 Sven Lindberg as Björn 'Tårtpapperet' Bergkvist
 Erik Strandmark as 	Hebbe
 Harriett Philipson as	Inez
 Stig Järrel as Chief Constable
 Arne Källerud as 	Kina's Father
 Torsten Lilliecrona as Lundkvist, lector
 Gus Dahlström as 	Comic Actor
 Holger Höglund as Comic Actor
 Stellan Agerlo as 	Ricke
 Yvonne Axö as 	Görel
 Julia Cæsar as Displeased Customer
 Hans Dahlberg as Tjatte
 Märta Dorff as 	Ellen
 Arthur Fischer as News-stand Owner
 Agda Helin as Kina's Mother
 Sven Holmberg as 	Pawnshop Customer
 Solveig Jäder as 	Grönholm's maid
 Lennart Lilja as 	The killed man
 Sune Mangs as 	Pupil
 Artur Rolén as 	Nilsson, trades-man
 Nina Scenna as 	Gullan, Adolf's wife
 Ann-Marie Skoglund as 	Anni
 Gunnel Sporr as Hebbe's Wife
 Elsa Winge as 	Kent's Mother
 Carl-Gunnar Wingård as Adolf
 Gudrun Östbye as Gerd's Friend

References

Bibliography 
 Qvist, Per Olov & von Bagh, Peter. Guide to the Cinema of Sweden and Finland. Greenwood Publishing Group, 2000.

External links 
 

1953 films
Swedish drama films
1953 drama films
1950s Swedish-language films
Films directed by Egil Holmsen
Films shot in Stockholm
Films set in Stockholm
1950s Swedish films